Prince of Chu may refer to:

Han dynasty
Han Xin, (202 BC–201 BC) a military commander served under Liu Bang.
Kings of the Chu Kingdom

Jin dynasty
Sima Wei, (271–291), one of the prince in War of the Eight Princes.
Huan Xuan, (369–404) a former Jin general who briefly took over the imperial throne.

Tang dynasty
Li You, fifth son of Emperor Taizong of Tang
Emperor Xuanzong of Tang
Emperor Daizong of Tang

Yuan dynasty
Yahudu, grandson of Batu Khan.
Duoletiemur, son of Yahudu.

Ming dynasty
Zhu Zhen, sixth son of Hongwu Emperor.

See also
 Chu (state)